The 2014 Kyrgyzstan Football Super Cup (Kyrgyz: Кыргызстандын футбол Суперкубогу) was the 5th Kyrgyzstan Super Cup match, a football match which will contest between the 2013 Top League and 2013 Kyrgyzstan Cup champion, Alay, and the finalist Top League Dordoi.

Match details

Match details

Super Cup
Kyrgyzstan Super Cup